Jonas Brothers: Living the Dream is an American reality television series on Disney Channel that followed the life of the band Jonas Brothers. The show featured the personal lives of the brothers and their life on tours. The series' first season premiered on May 16, 2008. In March 2010, the show returned with a new season. The second season ended on May 31, 2010. The show was canceled shortly afterwards.

Cast
 Kevin Jonas
 Joe Jonas
 Nick Jonas

Episodes

Series overview

Season 1 (2008)

Season 2 (2010)

References

External links
Jonas Brothers: Living the Dream website

2000s American reality television series
2010s American reality television series
2008 American television series debuts
2010 American television series endings
Disney Channel original programming
English-language television shows
Jonas Brothers
Television series about brothers
Television series about teenagers
Television series by Disney